Beccari's sheath-tailed bat (Emballonura beccarii) is a species of sac-winged bat in the family Emballonuridae. It is found in New Guinea and in some nearby islands in both Indonesia and Papua New Guinea.

Taxonomy
It was described as a new species in 1881 by German naturalist Wilhelm Peters and Italian naturalist Giacomo Doria. The eponym for the species name "beccari" is Odoardo Beccari, an Italian botanist who conducted a zoological research expedition on the island of New Guinea where the bat was first documented.

Biology
It is nocturnal, roosting in sheltered places such as caves during the day. At night, it forages for its prey—insects—along forest streams, in dense forests, and in clearings. Its range includes several islands of Indonesia and Papua New Guinea.

It is currently evaluated as least concern by the IUCN. Some populations may be threatened by overharvesting for bushmeat.

References

Emballonura
Bats of Oceania
Bats of Indonesia
Bats of New Guinea
Mammals of Papua New Guinea
Mammals of Western New Guinea
Least concern biota of Asia
Least concern biota of Oceania
Mammals described in 1881
Taxa named by Wilhelm Peters
Taxa named by Giacomo Doria
Taxonomy articles created by Polbot